Ignác Batthyány (born 30 June 1741, Németújvár (present-day Güssing), Kingdom of Hungary; died 17 November 1798, Gyulafehérvár (present-day Alba Iulia), Principality of Transylvania) was a Roman Catholic Bishop of Transylvania.

He was librarian at the Collegium Germanicum et Hungaricum in Rome. After being appointed as bishop of Transylvania in 1781, he described himself as "the zealous protector and promoter of the sciences in Transylvania.”

Ignác Batthyány was the founder of the Batthyaneum Library in Gyulafehérvár (Alba Iulia).

Between 1792-1798 he commissioned the restoration of Martinuzzi Castle.

References

1741 births
1798 deaths
18th-century Roman Catholic bishops in Hungary
People from Alba Iulia
Ignac
Collegium Germanicum et Hungaricum alumni
Bishops of Transylvania